A nicotinic antagonist is a type of anticholinergic drug that inhibits the action of acetylcholine (ACh) at nicotinic acetylcholine receptors. These compounds are mainly used for peripheral muscle paralysis in surgery, the classical agent of this type being tubocurarine, but some centrally acting compounds such as bupropion, mecamylamine, and 18-methoxycoronaridine block nicotinic acetylcholine receptors in the brain and have been proposed for treating nicotine addiction.

Note: Succinylcholine is a nicotinic agonist.  See neuromuscular blocking agents page for details on the mechanism of action.

See also 
 Nicotinic acetylcholine receptor
 Nicotinic agonist
 Muscarinic acetylcholine receptor
 Muscarinic agonist
 Muscarinic antagonist

References

External links